Akhethetep or Akhethotep may refer to:

 Akhethetep (son of Ptahhotep), senior court official during the rule of Pharaoh Djedkare and Unas
 Akhethetep (Old Kingdom official), possibly at the end of the 5th Dynasty or beginning of the 6th (24th century BC)
 Akhethetep (Louvre mastaba), possibly at the end of the 5th Dynasty or beginning of the 6th (24th century BC)
 Akhethetep Hemi, senior court official during the reign of Pharaoh Unas at the end of the 5th Dynasty (24th century BC)
 Akhethetep (official), ancient Egyptian officer with modest job titles, dating unknown

Ancient Egyptian given names